The Women's 200 Freestyle at the 11th FINA World Aquatics Championships was swum 26 and 27 July 2005 in Montreal, Quebec, Canada.  On 26 July, preliminary heats and semifinals occurred, and on 27 July a final heat was swum in the evening. 64 swimmers were entered in the event, of which 62 swam in one of 8 heats. The top-16 swimmers from the preliminary heats advanced on to semifinals; the top-8 swimmers in the two semifinals heats advanced onto the next night's final.

The existing records at the start of the event were:
World record (WR): 1:56.64, Franziska van Almsick (Germany), 3 August 2002 in Berlin, Germany.
Championship record (CR): 1:56.78, Franziska van Almsick (Germany), 6 September 1994 in Rome, Italy.

Results

Final

Semifinals

Prelims

See also
Swimming at the 2003 World Aquatics Championships – Women's 200 metre freestyle
Swimming at the 2004 Summer Olympics – Women's 200 metre freestyle
Swimming at the 2007 World Aquatics Championships – Women's 200 metre freestyle

References

FINA Worlds 2005: Women’s 200 Freestyle heats results from OmegaTiming.com (official timer of the 2005 Worlds). Published 2005-07-30, retrieved 2011-01-21.
FINA Worlds 2005: Women’s 200 Freestyle semifinals results from OmegaTiming.com (official timer of the 2005 Worlds). Published 2005-07-30, retrieved 2011-01-21.
FINA Worlds 2005: Women’s 200 Freestyle final results from OmegaTiming.com (official timer of the 2005 Worlds). Published 2005-07-30, retrieved 2011-01-21.

Swimming at the 2005 World Aquatics Championships
2005 in women's swimming